Antoine Argoud (26 June 1914 – 10 June 2004) was a French Army officer specializing in counter-insurgency during the Algerian War of Independence. Argoud's opposition to Algerian independence from France resulted in his joining of the Organisation armée secrète (OAS) and support for its use of violence in opposition to this policy.

Argoud was twice placed on trial and convicted (the first in absentia) of attempting to assassinate French President Charles de Gaulle. Following the second trial Argoud was sentenced to life imprisonment, but released as part of a general amnesty in 1968. On his release, he went on to live in Portugal as a consultant to the Portuguese Army. He returned to France in 1974.

On 25 February 1963, when Antoine Argoud was hiding in Munich after the failed 22 August 1962, assassination attempt on de Gaulle, he was kidnapped by French secret police CRS agents at the Eden-Wolff hotel, and smuggled to France, where he was interrogated. His revelation allowed the secret service to arrest Jean-Marie Bastien-Thiry and other assassins.

Bibliography 
 André Cocastre-Zilgien L'affaire Argoud. Considérations sur les arrestations internationalement irrégulières, Pédone, 1965

External links
Argoud charged over de Gaulle plot
Obituary of Antoine Argoud

1914 births
2004 deaths
People from Darney
French Army officers
French Army personnel of World War II
French military personnel of the Algerian War
French prisoners sentenced to life imprisonment
Members of the Organisation armée secrète

Prisoners sentenced to life imprisonment by France